The canton of Savigny-sur-Orge is an administrative division of the Essonne department, Île-de-France region, northern France. Its borders were modified at the French canton reorganisation which came into effect in March 2015. Its seat is in Savigny-sur-Orge.

It consists of the following communes:
Morangis
Savigny-sur-Orge
Wissous

References

Cantons of Essonne